The Iran and Libya Sanctions Act of 1996 (ILSA) was a 1996 act of the United States Congress that imposed economic sanctions on firms doing business with Iran and Libya. On September 20, 2004, the President signed an Executive Order to terminate the national emergency with respect to Libya and to end IEEPA-based economic sanctions on Libya. On September 30, 2006, the Act was renamed the Iran Sanctions Act (ISA). The Act was originally limited to five years, and has been extended several times. On December 1, 2016, ISA was extended for a further ten years.

The Act empowers the President to waive sanctions on a case-by-case basis, which is subject to renewal every six months. As at March 2008, ISA sanctions had not been enforced against any non-US company. Despite the restrictions on American investment in Iran, FIPPA provisions apply to all foreign investors, and many Iranian expatriates based in the US continue to make substantial investments in Iran.

Background
In 1995, in response to the Iranian nuclear program and Iranian support for Hezbollah, Hamas, and Palestine Islamic Jihad, that are considered terrorist organizations by the US, President Bill Clinton had issued several executive orders with respect to Iran, including Executive Order 12957 of March 15, 1995, banning U.S. investment in Iran's energy sector, and Executive Order 12959 of May 6, 1995, which banned U.S. trade with and investment in Iran.

Provisions
The Act targets both U.S. and non-U.S. business making certain investments in Iran. Under ISA, unless exempted by the president, all foreign companies that provide investments over $20 million for the development of petroleum resources in Iran will be imposed two out of seven possible sanctions, by the U.S.:
 denial of Export-Import Bank of the United States assistance
 denial of export licenses for exports to the violating company
 prohibition on loans or credits from U.S. financial institutions of over $10 million in any 12-month period
 prohibition on designation as a primary dealer for U.S. government debt instruments
 prohibition on serving as an agent of the United States or as a repository for U.S. government funds
 denial of U.S. government procurement opportunities (consistent with World Trade Organization obligations), and
 a ban on all or some imports of the violating company.

Renewal and expiration
ILSA included a five-year sunset clause and was to expire on August 5, 2001. In the debate in the U.S. Congress on whether ILSA should expire, some legislators argued sanctions  hindered bilateral relations, and others argued they would be seen as a concession on an effective program. ILSA was renewed by the Congress and signed by President George W. Bush. ILSA was renewed for another five years, until August 2006.

In 2005, the Iran Freedom Support bill was introduced in both houses to extend the provisions of ILSA indefinitely and to impose a time limit for the administration to determine whether an investment violates ILSA. The House of Representatives legislation, H.R. 282 was introduced on January 6, 2005, was reported by committee on March 15, 2006, and passed the House on April 26, 2006, by a vote of 397–21, with 14 not voting. The companion Senate legislation, S. 333 was introduced on February 9, 2005, was referred to the Foreign Relations Committee. The bill was not reported by the committee and died.

On July 25, 2006, bill H.R. 5877, to extend ILSA until September 29, 2006, was introduced in the House, and passed the next day by voice vote. It was passed by the Senate by unanimous consent on July 31, and was signed into law by President George W. Bush on August 4, 2006.

On September 30, 2006, ILSA was renamed the Iran Sanctions Act (ISA), as it no longer applied to Libya, and extended until December 31, 2011. The Iran Freedom and Support Act passed later that year. The Comprehensive Iran Sanctions, Accountability, and Divestment Act of 2010 amended the Iran Sanctions Act to expand the president's ability to punish companies aiding Iran's petroleum sector.

On December 1, 2016, ISA was extended for a further ten years.

See also
 United States sanctions against Iran
 Sanctions against Iran
 Blocking statute

References

External links
 US Treasury - Iran sanctions

Acts of the 104th United States Congress
Acts of the 107th United States Congress
Iran–United States relations
United States foreign relations legislation
1996 in international relations
Libya–United States relations
Sanctions against Iran
Sanctions against Libya
Sanctions legislation
United States sanctions